Maurizio Sciarra (born 15 April 1955) is an Italian film director.

Awards 
He was awarded the Golden Leopard at the 2001 Locarno International Film Festival for Off to the Revolution by a 2CV

References

External links
 

1955 births
Living people
People from Bari
Italian film directors